Bhadrachitta is a 1989 Indian Malayalam-language film directed by Nazeer and produced by Khaleel, starring Geetha, Sukumaran, Devan and Roopa The film also stars Shankar in a guest role.

Cast

Geetha as Bhadra
Devan
Sukumaran
Thodupuzha Vasanthi
Roopa as Chinnu's Mother 
Kavitha Thampi as Chinnu
Bahadoor
Prathapachandran
Valsala Menon
Nahas
Shankar

Trivia

Bhadrachitta was among the last releases of Shankar as he decided to leave film industry.

Soundtrack
All songs are written by ONV Kurup.

"Ridayathin" - KJ Yesudas
"Poomukhathalathile" - KJ Yesudas
"Aathmasugandham" - Lathika, chorus

References

1989 films
1980s Malayalam-language films
Films scored by Ouseppachan